Phacelia lemmonii is a species of phacelia known by the common name Lemmon's phacelia. It is native to the southwestern United States, where it grows in mountain and sandy desert habitat.

Description
Phacelia lemmonii is an annual herb producing a branching or unbranched stem up to about 20 centimeters in maximum height. It is glandular and lightly hairy in texture. The lobed oval leaves are 1 to 4 centimeters long. The glandular, hairy inflorescence is a one-sided curving or coiling cyme of bell-shaped flowers. Each flower is about half a centimeter long and white to pale lavender with a tubular yellow throat.

External links
Phacelia lemmonii. The Jepson Manual
Phacelia lemmonii. CalPhotos

lemmonii
Flora of the California desert regions
Flora of the Southwestern United States